Pogonomyrmex fossilis is an extinct ant species which lived during the Eocene 34 million years ago. The species built nests primarily destined to store seeds and grains as winter stock. The ant has an average length of six millimeter and an average width of 1.2 millimeters.
 
The first fossil was found in the American state of Colorado and the species was discovered and described by Carpenter in 1930. In 2003 Pogonomyrmex fossilis was the oldest described species within the genus Pogonomyrmex.

References 

†Pogonomyrmex fossilis
Fossil ant taxa
Insects described in 1930
Eocene insects
History of Colorado